The Scandal (French: Le Scandale) is a 1934 French romantic drama film directed by Marcel L'Herbier and starring Gaby Morlay, Henri Rollan, and Jean Galland. The film is based on a play written by Henry Bataille, which had previously been turned in a 1923 British silent film of the same title.

The film's sets were designed by the art directors Robert Gys and Pierre Schild.

Cast 
 Gaby Morlay as Charlotte Férioul
 Henri Rollanas Maurice Férioul
 Jean Galland as Count Artanezzo
 Mady Berry as Misses Férioul
 Pierre Larquey as Parizot
 Jean Marais as the lift operator
 Milly Mathis as the café keeper
 Mircha as Little Riquet
 Gaby Triquet as Suzanne
 André Nicolle as Jeannetier
 Paulette Burguet as Margaridou

See also 
 The Scandal (1923 film)

References

Bibliography
 Goble, Alan. The Complete Index to Literary Sources in Film. Walter de Gruyter, 1999.

External links 
 
 Le Scandale (1934) at the Films de France

1934 films
French romantic drama films
1930s French-language films
French black-and-white films
Films directed by Marcel L'Herbier
Films scored by Michel Michelet
1934 romantic drama films
French films based on plays
1930s French films